No Boys Allowed is the second and most recent studio album by American singer Keri Hilson. It was released on December 17, 2010, by Mosley Music Group, Zone 4, Inc. and Interscope Records. On the album, Hilson has reunited with Timbaland and Polow da Don, who executively produced the album, as they did with her debut release. Hilson also worked with several other producers and songwriters, including Ne-Yo, Tha Bizness, John Legend, StarGate, Bei Maejor and Boi-1da, among others. Meanwhile, Chris Brown, Rick Ross, Kanye West, J. Cole, Nelly and Timbaland, are serving as featured guest vocals. Musically, No Boys Allowed is an R&B album, which incorporates elements of pop, soul, electro and dancehall into various songs.

Upon its release, the album has received mixed reviews from most music critics, and peaked at number eleven on the US Billboard 200, selling 102,000 copies in its first week. Although it sold 8,000 copies more than her debut album, In a Perfect World... (2009), it failed to match that album's debut chart position of number four. No Boys Allowed also debuted on the US Top R&B/Hip-Hop Albums chart at number seven and at number ten on the UK R&B Albums Chart. The album's lead single, "Breaking Point", was released in the United States on September 7, 2010 and peaked at number forty-four on the US Hot R&B/Hip-Hop Songs chart. The second single, "Pretty Girl Rock", was released on October 12, 2010, and peaked within the top ten on the Hot R&B/Hip-Hop Songs chart and the top fifteen in New Zealand. Other two singles, "One Night Stand" and "Lose Control (Let Me Down)", were released for radio in March and May 2011, respectively.

Recording and production 
Following her acoustic performance of "Knock You Down" at Billboard headquarters in January 2010, Hilson told Mariel Concepcion of Billboard magazine, that she plans to start recording her second album soon and hopes to work with Robin Thicke, Lauryn Hill and Ryan Leslie. When asked how the album was coming along in June 2010, Hilson made the following comments to Rap-Up TV: "I've been in the studio with a lot of special people, a lot of big names, but a lot of talented people as well ... It's all about new inspiration that I have and just getting all the ideas that I've been collecting out, so it's time." She also confirmed reports that she's been working with Dr. Dre. In July 2010, Hilson revealed in an interview, that she has been working with Polow da Don, Tricky Stewart and Danja, who she had previously collaborated with for In a Perfect World... (2009). She also said, that the album would be released when the time is right. "We didn't want to rush this one ... I wanted it to be as organic and as emotional as the first one."

During this time, Lil' Kim told HollywoodTV, that she's been in the studio working on a collaboration with Hilson, on a song titled, "Buyou", and revealed Polow da Don produced the track. In an interview with The Boom Box, Hilson spoke of the song saying: "I wanted to talk about how it's not cool to mooch off your woman. It's not manly, it's very boy-like. I don't want to take care of my man. I do buy my own things. You are doing nothing for me, you are taking from me and that's not a good situation. Buy you a phone, buy you a car. It's like saying, come correct or don't come at all." However, "Buyou" with Lil' Kim did not make the final track listing, and was replaced with a different version of the song featuring J. Cole. In an interview, Hilson explained, "I happened to love it, [but] having all boy features kinda took precedent over that whole thing happening. However, the door is still open for a remix. In a Perfect World..., it would be [Lil'] Kim and Nicki Minaj on the same track." In August 2010, Hilson revealed in an interview with Global Grind that she did not going on any vacations for the Summer, and instead she moved to Los Angeles to work on the album with Timbaland and Polow da Don. A statement by Polow was released on Hilson's website, saying "Keri's intense focus on No Boys Allowed has been inspiring to both Timbaland and I, in and out of the studio. This will definitely be one of the best albums of 2010/2011." In November 2010, John Legend revealed in an interview with Rap-Up, that he wrote a song called, "All the Boys" for the album, and described the song as a "reminiscent of past love".

Conception and title 
In an interview with MTV News on March 24, 2010, Hilson revealed that her trip to Africa had heavily influenced the album's sound. She told the interviewer "Everywhere I travel, I get music from that region of the world. I've been to Nigeria, I've been to South Africa, three cities in Africa [in all]. I gather music from these regions, and African music is very drum-heavy. It was very inspiring. I'm definitely going to be using some of that inspiration." When Hilson was interviewed by Global Grind in August 2010, she explained that she was excited about the album's release, because it would be inspirational to all women, stating:"I really wanted to do an album to tell women to be confident, no matter what their circumstances. You have to push through, don't yield at the first sign of adversity. The theme of this event is celebrating the journey and not the success. My personal journey was over 12 years long. I had to sit back and be a songwriter when my first goal was to be an artist. I know a lot of women who just have given up, so I want them to have the same tenacity and drive that men have. I really went there on this album." When asked, by Allison Walker from Central Florida News 13, who was the inspiration behind the songs' lyrics?, Hilson replied "Many, many boys. Many, many, many boys. Even the boys in your life inspired this. I was in an imaginary clubhouse. A lot of times when I was sitting down to write, and I was in an imaginary clubhouse, you were there, Allison. My best friends. Your best friends. Our sisters, our mothers we were all sounding off and yelling at the top of our lungs everything we wish men knew about us. And, uh, so that's really what motivated a lot of the records." Although the album is called No Boys Allowed, Hilson told Lisa Binkert of Billboard magazine that "I have all male features on the album, but they're all men. Not boys ... I wanted to represent the male point of view. I'm not saying it's always good, but I want you to be honest; the same way that I'm honest about female's perspective. I wanted men to come and sound off." Hilson has stated in an interview with Perez Hilton that the album's title actually means, No Bullshit Allowed. She released a statement on her website about the title saying, "it's not about excluding men. It's more about women understanding that there comes a time in your life when you want a man. A real man. A grown up. Not a boy. And that's not a bad thing." The deluxe edition of No Boys Allowed had a slightly different album cover. The image, which is the same as the standard edition cover, appears in color against a pink tinged background.

Music 
Primarily an R&B album, No Boys Allowed also contains elements of pop, soul, electro and dancehall. Critics have noted the song, "Bahm Bahm (Do It Once Again)", as a reggae, dancehall track which has drawn comparisons to Rihanna. Other comparisons to Rihanna include "Lose Control/Let Me Down" to "What's My Name?", "Lie to Me" to "Love the Way You Lie" and the acoustic ballad "Hustler" to "California King Bed". "Breaking Point", which is the first single from No Boys Allowed, has lyrics that are about moving on from relationships that are not working and expecting men to step up to the plate and show women more respect and love. The song's style and sound have been compared to other artists such as Mary J. Blige and Prince. Mariel Concepcion of Billboard noted "Breaking Point" as a "reminiscent of Melanie Fiona's "Give It to Me Right" and Beyoncé's "Why Don't You Love Me".

"Pretty Girl Rock" is a mid-tempo R&B song, which incorporates an interpolation of "Just the Two of Us" by Grover Washington, Jr. When asked about the concept of the song, Hilson stated "I want everybody to feel like they can do the pretty girl rock [dance] ... It's like the hair brush in the mirror, don't hate me cause I'm beautiful, cause you are. Everybody is beautiful." "The Way You Love Me" is an upbeat song which generates influences of electro, R&B, and dance-pop. The song has been criticized for its explicit lyrics, that features the hook "Fuck me, fuck me", and the line "I got the kinda pussy that'll keep you out the streets". According to Matthew Horton of BBC Online, Hilson's smooth vocals on "Beautiful Mistake", takes you back to Michael Jackson's Thriller album. On the other hand, "Gimme What I Want" has been described as an "electro anthem", and according to Andy Kellman of Allmusic, the song is part two to both "Turnin Me On" and "Get Your Money Up". The album also includes the ballads "All the Boys", "Toy Soldier" and "One Night Stand" with Chris Brown, which has been described as a "very '90s-sounding R&B ballad."

Release and promotion 
In September 2010, Rap-Up magazine confirmed that No Boys Allowed would be released on November 30, 2010. However, the album's release date was rescheduled to December 21, 2010. No Boys Allowed was released in two separate editions: the standard and the deluxe, with both editions' digital releases containing the album's CD booklet. The deluxe edition also includes four bonus tracks, "Hustler", "Lie to Me", "Won't Be Long" and "Fearless", with the latter released only on iTunes.

The album's promotion began in November 2010 when Hilson appeared on the front cover of Vibe magazine. On November 7, 2010, "The Way You Love Me" premiered online. A Laurie Ann Gibson-directed mini-movie for the song was shot in Los Angeles during October and featured cameo appearances from JoJo, Faith Evans, Dawn Richard, Columbus Short and Polow Da Don. The mini-movie premiered on WorldStarHipHop.com on November 28, 2010, and was released to iTunes Stores on December 7, 2010. The video was criticized because of the song's explicit lyrics ("I got the kinda pussy that'll keep you out the streets"), and the limited amount of clothing Hilson had worn in the video. Critics accused the singer of swerving into a racy lane just for page views and album sales for No Boys Allowed. In an interview with Perez Hilton, Hilson defended the clip and said, "If you put it in context with my album, my album is called No Boys Allowed but really it means no bullshit allowed. In this album, I was screaming in a room — just like I was screaming in the song — I was screaming in a room with all my girlfriends, yelling all the shit we really say." A clean version of the song can be found on No Boys Allowed as track three. Two other songs were also released online. The Lil' Kim-assisted "Buyou" premiered on November 15, 2010. and "Toy Soldier" premiered on the Billboard website on December 13, 2010.

On November 22, 2010, Hilson performed "Pretty Girl Rock" on The Tonight Show with Jay Leno, followed by a performance of the song at the 84th Annual Macy's Thanksgiving Day Parade on November 25, 2010. She also performed the song while co-headlining the VH1 Divas Salute the Troops concert with artists like Nicki Minaj and Katy Perry on December 5, 2010, and on the Lopez Tonight show on December 7, 2010. The next day, Hilson appeared on the Chelsea Lately show to promote the album. She also appeared on The Today Show on December 14, 2010, and performed "Pretty Girl Rock". The album cover was unveiled on November 10, 2010. The official track listing was released on Amazon.com on December 6, 2010, along with snippets of the album's songs. Prior to this, photo shoots for the album were released online on December 11, 2010. On December 15, 2010, Hilson performed several of the album's songs at a listening party in her hometown of Atlanta, during the Hot 107.9 FM Christmas party.

Singles 
"Breaking Point" was released as the lead single in the United States on September 7, 2010. The song was produced by Timbaland and JRoc, and talks about moving on from relationships that are not working and expecting men to step up to the plate and show women more respect and love. Critics gave the song mixed to positive reviews. While Billboard magazine's Mariel Concepcion described the song as an "reminiscent of Melanie Fiona's "Give It to Me Right" and Beyoncé's "Why Don't You Love Me", Rap-Up noted the song as "vintage-sounding". It was one of Hilson's least successful singles in the United States, only reaching number forty-four on the US Hot R&B/Hip-Hop Songs chart.

"Pretty Girl Rock" premiered at the Beats By Dr. Dre concert in New York City on September 29, 2010 and released as the album's second single on October 12, 2010. The song was sent to rhythmic radio in the United States on October 19, 2010, and mainstream radio on October 26, 2010. It has reached a current peak of number six on the US Hot R&B/Hip-Hop Songs chart, and peaked at number twenty-four on the Billboard Hot 100. "Pretty Girl Rock" became Hilson's fifth top-fifteen R&B/Hip-Hop Songs hit. On December 27, 2010, the song entered the New Zealand Singles Chart at number twelve, and has since peaked at number eleven. On January 22, 2011, it debuted on the UK Singles Chart at number fifty-three and at number seventeen on the UK R&B Chart.

"One Night Stand" featuring Chris Brown, was sent to urban mainstream radio as the album's third single on March 8, 2011. In February 2011, Hilson told Rap-Up magazine that she was considering choosing "One Night Stand" as the next single from No Boys Allowed, after an outpouring of fan support. She said, "My fans are really liking 'One Night Stand' with Chris Brown ... I have a lot of favorites, but the fans are wanting 'One Night Stand.' It's going to be my urban single. Not going to be, but if we go with it, we'll go with that." The song has appeared on the US Hot R&B/Hip-Hop Songs chart at 19. "Lose Control (Let Me Down)" was sent to rhythmic radio on May 10, 2011, as the album's fourth single.

Commercial performance 
When speaking of her expectations for No Boys Allowed, Hilson said she hoped that she would sell more than 35,000 copies. "I would like to higher than 35k – I mean anyone would... I saw a quote where she said it's not all about the numbers and I'm not really a chart reader, I don't look at charts. It's probably what she honestly feels." The media took Hilson's comments as a response to fellow R&B singer Ciara, whose album Basic Instinct sold 37,000 copies and was followed by a statement which read almost exactly like Hilson's comments. In the end, No Boys Allowed opened on the Billboard 200 at number eleven with 102,000 copies sold, and although it sold 8,000 copies more than her debut album did in its first week, In a Perfect World..., it failed to match that album's debut chart position of number four. On the U.S. R&B/Hip-Hop Albums, No Boys Allowed debuted at number seven, giving Hilson her second top-ten album on the chart, but again failed to match her debut album's position of number one.

In its second week, No Boys Allowed experienced a 68% decline in sales, shifting a further 33,000 copies and causing the album to drop four spots on the Billboard 200 to number fifteen. On the R&B/Hip-Hop Albums Chart, the album dropped one spot down to number eight. As of April 2012 the album has sold 312,808 copies in the United States. In the United Kingdom, the No Boys Allowed debuted on the UK Albums Chart at number seventy six, considerably lower than Hilson's previous album, In a Perfect World..., which debuted at number twenty-two. However, in comparison, her previous album was released off the back of the 2009 top-five single "Knock You Down", whereas No Boys Alloweds lead single, "Pretty Girl Rock", only managed to reach top-sixty. No Boys Allowed has sold 447,000 copies globally. The album was considerably more successful on the UK R&B Chart, where it reached number ten.

Critical response 

No Boys Allowed received mixed reviews from most music critics. At Metacritic, which assigns a normalized rating out of 100 to reviews from mainstream critics, the album received an average score of 54, based on 13 reviews, which indicates "mixed or average reviews". Allmusic writer Andy Kellman viewed the album as overproduced and commented that it "often falls flat". Ben Ratliff of The New York Times wrote that "Hilson gets a certain energy out of bossiness", but expressed a mixed response towards its production and viewed that the album lacks a "narrative". Slant Magazine's Eric Henderson gave it two-and-a-half out of five stars and commented that Hilson "misses the independence espoused by everywomen Khan and Houston and essentially says 'That's a good idea' to her reverse harem of producer-songwriters". Los Angeles Times writer Margaret Wappler commented that Hilson "is concerned with boundaries" and stated "nearly every song is cluttered with as much textural filigree as possible to distract from the absence of narcotic radio hooks". Caroline Sullivan of The Guardian noted its "conventional sex-and-love piffle" and wrote that the album "is muddled and devoid of the gutsiness the title leads us to". Rolling Stone writer Rob Sheffield called the album "hit-or-miss, with failed attempts at pop crossover (the Timbaland collabo 'Breaking Point') and sub-Rihanna reggae moves", but noted "Pretty Girl Rock" and "The Way You Love Me" as "the high points [...] worth digging out".

Mikael Wood of Entertainment Weekly wrote that "this zigzagging sophomore disc... suggests she's not quite sure where to go next", but wrote favorably the "sensual future-soul slow jams such as 'One Night Stand' and the Timbaland-produced 'Breaking Point'". Glenn Gamboa of Newsday gave it a B+ rating and complimented its "brassy hip-hop and sassy soul". Jason Richards of NOW expressed a mixed response towards its "singles choices" and commented on the prominently male production team, but found it "Impressive, then, that this boy-army, one-girl team was able to pull off a contemporary R&B album so feminine, breezy and thankfully low on ballads". USA Todays Elysa Gardner gave the album two-and-a-half out of four stars and noted "how little of her own voice comes through on this set of smart and pleasurable but mostly disposable pop-soul candy". BBC Online's Matthew Horton found its music less "ordinary" than that of her previous album and commented that "Hilson is in warm, confident voice throughout". Ken Capobianco of The Boston Globe complimented the songs concerning "finger-wagging affirmations of self", but wrote that "she never maintains this strong sense of purpose. Instead, Hilson loses focus with hookless songs the busy production can't save".

Track listing 
 Track listing and credits from the album booklet.

Notes
 In Japan, only one version of the album was released. The Japanese version, features the deluxe edition cover art and eighteen songs (the twelve standard edition songs plus the deluxe edition extra songs and two of the international bonus tracks, only without the song “Drippin’”).

Sample credits
 "Pretty Girl Rock", and "Pretty Girl Rock (Remix)", interpolate "Just the Two of Us" as written by Bill Withers, Ralph MacDonald and William Salter.

Personnel 
Credits for No Boys Allowed adapted from Allmusic.

 Brian Allison – assistant, assistant engineer
 Arden Altino – producer
 Marcella "Ms. Lago" Araica – mixing
 Matt Benefield – assistant engineer
 Charlie Bereal – producer
 Adam Beyrer – editing
 Billy B. – make-up
 Boi-1DA – producer
 Veronika Bozeman – vocal producer, background vocals
 Matthew Burnett – additional production
 Kelvin Chu – A&R
 Corey Shoemaker – engineer
 Kevin "KD" Davis – mixing
 Demacio "Demo" Castellon – mixing
 Mike DeSalvo – assistant
 DJ Mormile – A&R
 Jerry "Wonda" Duplessis – producer
 Mikkel S. Eriksen – engineer, instrumental
 Cliff Feiman – production supervisor
 Rick Frazier – A&R
 Avena Gallagher – stylist
 Todd Gallopo – art direction, design
 Chris Gerhinger – mastering
 Chris Godbey – engineer, mixing
 Moses Gollart – assistant
 Jerome "Jroc" Harmon – producer
 Chuck Harmony – producer
 Koby Hass – assistant
 Tor Erik Hermansen – instrumental
 Keri Hilson – arranger, vocal arrangement, vocal producer
 Hollywood Hotsauce – producer
 Chazi Hourani – assistant

 Ghazi Hourani – assistant
 Mike "TrakGuru" Johnson – engineer, vocal engineer
 Aljamaal Jones – A&R
 Brandon Jones – mixing assistant
 Bryan "The Beard" Jones – assistant, engineer, vocal engineer
 Jerel Lake – mixing assistant
 Damien Lewis – assistant engineer, engineer
 James Lewis – guitar
 Bei Maejor – additional production
 Ian Mercel – assistant engineer
 Krista Michalski – coordination
 Clint Nelson – assistant
 Terrence Nelson – A&R
 Maisha Oliver – hair stylist
 Jason "JP" Perry – keyboards
 Polow da Don – additional production, executive producer, producer
 Edward Sanders – assistant
 Kevin Schinstock – engineer
 Mike Scott – guitar
 Eric Spence – A&R
 Stargate – producer
 John Stephens – piano
 Jeremy Stevenson – engineer
 Dalya Taman – creative coordinator
 Phil Tan – mixing
 Timbaland – producer
 Sergio "Sergical" Tsai – engineer, mixing
 William Villane – assistant
 Miles Walker – engineer
 Kevin Wilson – assistant
 Andre Yu – cello

Charts

Weekly charts

Year-end charts

Release history

References

External links 
 No Boys Allowed at Metacritic

2010 albums
Keri Hilson albums
Interscope Records albums
Albums produced by Boi-1da
Albums produced by Chuck Harmony
Albums produced by Danja (record producer)
Albums produced by Jerome "J-Roc" Harmon
Albums produced by Polow da Don
Albums produced by Stargate
Albums produced by Timbaland
Albums produced by Maejor